"Hallelujah" is the first single to be released from ThisGirl's album Uno. The single was released prior to the album on June 14, 2004.

Track listing
CD1
 "Hallelujah" - 2:44
 "Moustache to Fit a King" - 3:34
 "Excited" - 3:55
CD2
 "Hallelujah" - 2:38
 "Beeping at Pedestrians" - 3:34
 "Dreams Dreams Dreams V-VIII" - 4:12

CD1 includes a track called "Excited" which is a modified version of the track "Excited But Tired" which is from ThisGirl's EP Demo's for the Family.

CD2 also includes a modified track called "Dreams Dreams Dreams V-VIII". The original version can be found on the Demo's for the Family EP under the name "Dreams Dreams Dreams I, Dreams, Dreams, Dreams, IV".

Reception
Reviews of the single were mixed, some praise the songs for their bouncy/energetic edge, with comments such as Carnaple.com's:

Others criticize the band's change of style from their earlier songs, with BBC music review saying:

Music video
The music video for "Hallelujah" was directed by Armando from Retro-juice productions. The video features a variety of shots of the band performing live and shots of a recording studio.

References

2004 singles
2004 songs
Song articles with missing songwriters